Angry Birds POP! is a tile matching game co-developed by Rovio Entertainment and Outplay Entertainment that was soft launched for iOS in Canada in December 2014 and released worldwide for iOS and Android devices in March 2015. The game was originally the second game in the Angry Birds Stella series.

It was originally released as Angry Birds Stella POP!, and was given its current name, without Stella, with an update in July 2015 that brought classic Angry Birds characters into the game, making it the only one in the series to involve a crossover between classic Angry Birds and Stella's friends. In October 2015, the game was released as a Facebook game that was discontinued on December 21, 2016. As of May 2021, the game contains over 6000 levels.

Gameplay

Angry Birds POP! is the second game of the Angry Birds Stella series. The game released on December 22, 2014, in the Canada App Store and released worldwide on March 12, 2015. On October 29, 2015, the game was added to Facebook. The game features the slingshot lined up in the bottom center, the player flings the bubbles to pop the bubbles at the top with a combination of three or more bubbles with the same color. Each level will give you a limited number of bubbles given at the slingshot and you can buy more by coins. Sometimes, there are also blocks appears at the top along with the bubbles. The game also has lives like all other match-3 games. When you lose a level, you will lose one of it and if you lost all the lives, you must buy them by coins to continue playing. The game initially featured only the six characters that appeared in Angry Birds Stella, with each character having a special power that can be used when the Pop Meter is full to unlock powerful boosts from their powers like Stella's Power Pop, Poppy's Line Pop and many more. To fill the Pop Meter, you have to get x6 Streaks, that means 6 pops in a row.

Reception
Angry Birds POP! was seen by some as similar to King's 2014 title, Bubble Witch Saga 2. The Macworld reviewer enjoyed it as a free game, with its light puzzle gameplay and good production values but once a barrier in play presents itself, the reviewer thought it was best to do something else.

Sequel

A sequel, Angry Birds POP 2 (later renamed Angry Birds POP Blast) was released in 2019.  Players solve each level in this game with one bird and one pig who each can be upgraded and offer different abilities that can be activated once bubbles of a certain color are popped (Red bubbles build up the bird's rage that fuels an ability that directly destroys other bubbles, while green bubbles increase the pig's skills so that he can use an ability that replaces some bubbles with an item that confers certain benefits when shot).  The sequel is set after the events of The Angry Birds Movie 2, as the fledgling alliance between Birds and Pigs confronts a mysterious, unseen threat that infests the world with bubbles, spawns mysterious one-eyed creatures and traps young hatchlings and piglets in bubbles alike.

See also

 Puzzle Bobble

References

IOS games
Android (operating system) games
Facebook games
Tile-matching video games
2014 video games
Angry Birds spin-offs
POP!
Video games developed in Finland
Rovio Entertainment games